The TICC may be:

 Taipei International Convention Center in Taipei, Taiwan
 Tanga International Conference Centre in Tanga, Tanzania